Ellingråsa Lighthouse is a lighthouse that is located on the island of Bjørøya in the Folda sea in the municipality of Flatanger in Trøndelag county, Norway.  The lighthouse was completed in 1888 to replace the old Villa Lighthouse which closed in 1890.  Ellingråsa Lighthouse was automated in 1959.

The tower sits right next to the old Ellingråsa Lighthouse building which was closed in 2001.

See also

Lighthouses in Norway
List of lighthouses in Norway

References

External links
 Norsk Fyrhistorisk Forening 
 Picture of Ellingråsa Lighthouse

Lighthouses completed in 1888
Lighthouses in Trøndelag
Flatanger